The following outline is provided as an overview of and topical guide to health:

Health – functional and metabolic efficiency of an organism. It is the ability to live long, function well (physically and mentally), and prosper.

Essence of personal health

 Homeostasis – property of a system in which variables are regulated so that internal conditions remain stable and relatively constant. Examples of homeostasis include the regulation of temperature and the balance between acidity and alkalinity (pH). 
 Immunity
 Life – characteristic distinguishing physical entities having biological processes (such as signaling and self-sustaining processes) from those that do not, either because such functions have ceased (death), or because they lack such functions and are classified as inanimate. 
 Mental health
 Physical fitness
 Survivability of the individual
 Wellness

Reproductive health

Reproductive health
 Reproductive rights
 Men's health
 Women's health
 Vulvovaginal health
 Maternal health
 Breastfeeding
 Family planning
 Fertility
 Infertility
 Birth control
 Sex education
 Safer sex
 Disorders
 Sexually transmitted disease
 Sexual dysfunction
 Reproductive medicine
 Andrology
 Gynaecology
 Obstetrics and gynaecology

Poor health

Illness
 Disability
 Disease
 Injury
 Muscle weakness
 Mental disorder
 Susceptibility to the above

Absence of health
 Death – termination of all biological functions that sustain a living organism.

Health maintenance

Personal health maintenance

Self-care
 Exercise
 General Fitness Training
 Healthy diet
 Hygiene
 Life extension
 Self-medication
 Nootropics
 Nutrients
 Nutrition
 Positive mental attitude
 Sleep hygiene
 Stress management
 Smoking cessation (Quitting smoking)
 Vitamins
 Weight loss

Health maintenance of the masses
Health care

Health care industry
Health care industry

Public health

Public health
 Health observatory
 World Health Organization
 :Category:Health ministries
 Global health

Health science

Health science
 10/90 gap
 Disease
 Medicine
 Sleep
 Stress

History of health

 Establishment of the World Health Organization
 History of the health care industry
 History of medicine
 History of public health
 Life expectancy over human history
 History of HIV
 History of pharmaceutical industry
 History of health care reform
 History of cancer
 History of environmental health
 History of genetics
 History of toxicology
 History of occupational health
 History of anthrax
 History of drug resistance
 History of antiretroviral therapy
 History of avian influenza
 History of cholera

Health education

Medical education
Nursing school
Medical school
List of medical schools
School of public health
Dental school
Pharmacy school

Health professionals 
 List of clinical psychologists
 List of dentists
 List of dermatologists
 List of fictional medical examiners
 List of immunologists
 List of members of the National Academy of Sciences (Medical genetics, hematology, and oncology)
 List of members of the National Academy of Sciences (Medical physiology and metabolism)
 List of members of the National Academy of Sciences (Physiology and pharmacology)
 List of members of the National Academy of Sciences (Psychology)
 List of neurologists
 List of Nobel laureates in Physiology or Medicine
 List of nurses
 List of pathologists
 List of people in alternative medicine
 List of pharmacists
 List of physicians
 List of psychiatrists
 List of psychologists
 List of psychologists on postage stamps

Medical schools and colleges

General 
 List of medical schools
 List of optometry schools
 List of osteopathic colleges
 List of pharmacy schools
 List of Seventh-day Adventist medical schools

Country specific 

 List of dental schools in Australia
 List of medical schools in Australia
 List of medical colleges in Bangladesh
 List of medical schools in Canada
 List of medical schools in Egypt
 List of medical colleges in India
 List of colleges of nursing in the Philippines
 List of medical colleges in Rajasthan
 List of medical schools in Syria
 List of dental schools in the United Kingdom
 List of medical schools in the United Kingdom
 List of historical medical schools in the United Kingdom
 List of pharmacy schools in the United Kingdom
 List of dental schools in the United States
 List of medical schools in the United States
 List of medical specialty colleges in the United States

See also

 Human enhancement
 Quality of life

External links

Centers for Disease Control and Prevention (USA)
National Center for Health Statistics (USA)
National Institute of Health (USA)
National Library of Medicine Pubmed Journal Search
European Agency for Safety and Health at Work EU-OSHA
The Public Health Portal of the European Union
World Health Organization

Health-related lists
Medical lists
Health
Health